Denny R. (born 11 February 1994, San Pablo City, Laguna, Philippines), commonly known by her pseudonym HaveYouSeenThisGirL, is a Filipino author.  She is best known for her novel, Diary ng Panget. It first appeared on Wattpad and was later published as a paperback by PSICOM Publishing Inc.  A film adaptation of her work was released in April 2014.

Personal life 
Denny was born in San Pablo, Laguna, where she studied from kindergarten to high school. She studied graphic advertising at Superiore I.P.C. Strocchi in Italy. She returned to the Philippines to study at Far Eastern University.

Works 
Denny began writing stories at the age of 13. Her book, Diary ng Panget (Diary of an Ugly) has been a commercial success and widely followed in Wattpad. The book has been adapted into a film. She also wrote She Died, a manga series that  also has been published on Wattpad. Her other works include Voiceless, that became popular because of the book's theme song  "Hear Me", Waiting for the Train (under the GOLD Manga Series), Steps to You, That Girl, One Bad Move, I Met A Jerk Whose Name Is Seven and 10 Signatures To Bargain With God.

In 2021, she published a romantic-comedy book The Most Painful Battle under PSICOM Publishing Inc.

References

External links
 

Living people
1994 births
Filipino writers
Far Eastern University alumni
People from San Pablo, Laguna
Writers from Laguna (province)